Sayali Chandsarkar, also professionally as Sayali Sanjeev, is an actress from Mumbai, Maharashtra, India. She works in Marathi film and TV shows. She has appeared in Marathi films Basta, Jhimma, Goshta Eka Paithanichi and AB Aani CD.

Acting career
She began her television soap career with Kahe Diya Pardes of Zee Marathi and Marathi film career with Atpadi Nights. She worked in Tanaji Ghadge directed Marathi film Basta. In 2019, she worked in a drama film, Goshta Eka Paithanichi and 'Rajshri Marathi' YouTube channel's 5 episode webseries, 'U Turn'. In 2021 she worked into a web series, Shubhmangal Online of voot application.

Other works 
Maharashtra Navnirman Sena (MNS) appointed her as a deputy president of their film labour wing.

Filmography

Television

Special appearances

Web series

Films

Music video

References

External links

 

1993 births
21st-century Indian actresses
Actresses in Marathi cinema
Indian film actresses
Indian television actresses
Living people
Marathi people